Vladimir Kunitsky (born 1948) is a Russian business executive who is the current CEO of Acron Group. He was appointed CEO in 2011, prior to that he served as Senior VP from 2006 to 2011. After graduating from Ural State University with a chemistry degree, he went to work for the company in 1983.

References

External links

1948 births
Russian chief executives
Living people
Ural State University alumni